X-treme Close Up features the history, facts and stories of American hard rock band Kiss, up to the time of filming in 1992. The video features vintage concert footage, interviews and videos from the early beginnings in the early 1970s to the early 1990s. It was released on July 14, 1992. The video has been praised for its informative nature and gives the viewer an inside look at the iconic band. It was certified Platinum in the US.

Track listing

Certifications

References

External links
 Kiss Online

Kiss (band) video albums
Rockumentaries
1992 films
American documentary films
1990s American films